Anne, Baroness Dőry de Jobaháza, formerly Princess Anna of Ardeck (née Anne Hollingsworth Price) (August 25, 1868 – April 24, 1945) was an American heiress and actress who married into the European aristocracy.

Early life
Anne was born on August 25, 1868 at Ellerslie Hall in Edgemoor, near Wilmington, Delaware. She was a daughter of oil magnate James Price II (1834–1904) and Sarah M. (née Harlan) Price (1832–1898). Her brother, Samuel Harlan Price, was married to Susan Coleman Wells (later Mrs. Morris R. Stroud). Anne was one of five sisters, who all married into the European nobility, which included Margaret Plater Price (who married in 1882 Edmund, Baron Wucherer von Huldenfeld, who was tutor to Archduke Eugen and Lord of the Manor of Gleinstätten), Susan Harlan Price (who married in 1885 Alexandru Socec, a general in Romanian Army), Matilda Louise Price (who married in 1883 Gábor, Baron Thyssen-Bornemisza, the King's Chamberlain who adopted their son-in-law Heinrich Thyssen), and Sallie Mae Price (who married in 1891 Maximillian, Baron von Berg).

Her paternal grandparents were Joseph Tatnall Price and Matilda Louise (née Sanderson) Price, and her maternal grandparents were Susan Preston (née Fairlamb) Harlan and Samuel Harlan Jr., of Harlan, Hollingsworth & Co., shipbuilders in Wilmington (who built Yampa, which was purchased by German Emperor William II). Harlan and Hollingsworth was acquired by Bethlehem Steel in 1904, although her grandfather Harlan had died in 1883 in Vienna.

Anne and her five sisters all were "beautiful and charming belles of Wilmington and Philadelphia, where they made their debuts." They spent a year in Europe with their parents, arriving in Vienna in the early 1880s. Matilda was the only daughter who ever returned to America. Reportedly, every time their father would return from his trip back to Philadelphia to manage the family business, one of his daughters would be engaged.

Personal life
On December 17, 1890, Anne was married to Friedrich Wilhelm, Prince of Ardeck (1858–1902) in Dresden. At the time of their wedding, the Prince, the eldest son of Maria von Hanau-Hořowitz and Prince William of Hesse-Philippsthal-Barchfeld, was a Lieutenant of the 2nd Hussar Regiment of the Prussian Army. His father was a son of Charles, Landgrave of Hesse-Philippsthal-Barchfeld and Princess Sophie of Bentheim and Steinfurt (a daughter of Prince Louis William Geldricus Ernest of Bentheim and Steinfurt. Notwithstanding that his mother was a daughter of Frederick William, Elector of Hesse-Cassel, the Grand Duke of Hesse-Darmstadt regarded his parents' marriage as morganatic. Upon his parents' divorce in 1872, his mother and the children were styled Princes of Ardeck and Princesses of Ardeck.

Her mother died in Stuttgart in April 1892. Prince Friedrich died on April 1, 1902 at Villa Wilhelmshöhe.

Second marriage
On February 4, 1904, she married Hungarian magnate Baron József Döry de Jobaháza (1868–1954) in Mihályi (formerly the Kingdom of Hungary). He was a son of Baron Nicholas Miklós Dőry de Jobaháza and Baroness Mária von Horváth de Szürnyeg. Together, they were the parents of four daughters (three of whom married titles), including:

 Mária Jozefa Cecilia Ann Wilhelmine Dőry de Jobaháza (1904–1945), who died during World War II.

In September 1904, her father died, also in Stuttgart. Anne and her husband's home was in Schloss Hody bei Galanta, Pressburger Comitate, Hungary. In 1910, they acquired Schloss Johnsdorf in Szepes County, Hungary.

In 1945, after the Russians pillaged Schloss Johnsdorf and carried off their daughter Mária, Anne and her husband fled to Austria where she died a month later, aged 80, on April 24, 1945 from "hardships suffered under the Russian occupation of Austria." Their daughter died three days later. Anne left her entire estate to her and the Baron Döry-Jobaháza, except for $750 that was directed towards the care of her first husband's grave in Warmbrunn, Schleisen, Germany. József died April 14, 1954 in Johnsdorf.

See also
List of American heiresses
Schloss Johnsdorf (German wiki)

Notes

References

External links

Schloss Johnsdorf

1868 births
1945 deaths
Anne
German princesses
Morganatic spouses of German royalty